Penang Times Square is an ongoing urban redevelopment project in George Town, Penang, Malaysia. It is located at Dato Keramat Road in the city centre, and comprises office blocks, condominiums, a shopping mall and an outdoor plaza. Developed by Ivory Properties Group, at present, the first two phases have been completed, while Phases 3, 4 and 5 are still in the works.

In 2016, a new shopping mall, M Mall O2O, was also opened as part of Phase 2 of the Penang Times Square project.

History 
Up until the late 20th century, the site was once a tin smelting plant owned by Eastern Smelting, which was formed in 1897. Tin was imported from Perak and southern Thailand to be smelted into ingots for re-export via the Port of Penang.

The decline of Malaysia's tin industry led to the closure of the tin smelting facility. The area was then acquired by Ivory Properties Group and the Penang Times Square project, which consisted of five phases, began in 2005.

As of 2016, Phases 1 and 2 have been completed. As part of Phase 2, M Mall O2O was officially launched in 2016. The remaining three phases are expected to be completed by 2020.

Shopping

Birch the Plaza 
Phase 1 of Penang Times Square includes a shopping mall housed within Birch the Plaza, a podium block that also consists of offices and commercial lots. The shopping mall itself covers the first three floors within the block.

The mall contains restaurants, fashion boutiques, nail parlours, beauty salons and electronic stores, in addition to a handful of nightclubs. Its 'Food Gallery' also offers a variety of local hawker fare.

It was reported that Birch the Plaza was being given a RM10 million facelift by Ivory Properties in 2016 to improve its tenancy rate.

M Mall O2O 

The newest shopping mall in George Town was the retail component of Phase 2 of the Penang Times Square project. Opened in 2016, the mall's latest attractions include Penang's first wax museum, various wall artwork and cultural-themed 'streets' at each of the mall's four floors.

As with Birch the Plaza, M Mall O2O has a variety of restaurants, electronic stores and personal care retail outlets.

References

External links 

 Penang Times Square

Shopping malls in Penang
Buildings and structures in George Town, Penang